A number of steamships were named Tennessee, including: 

 , a sidewheel steamer lost in 1865, that was also the Republic, USS Tennessee, CSS Tennessee, USS Mobile
 , a sidewheel steamer lost in 1870, built as a gunboat that was rebuilt as a merchantman, formerly USS Muscoota
 , an early 20th century ship of the Joy Steamship Company operating in the Long Island Sound
 , a cargo ship torpedoed and sunk by U-617 in 1942; formerly Fredensbro

See also
 
 
 Tennessee (disambiguation)

References

Ship names